Afloat may refer to:

Afloat (Maupassant) (Sur l'eau), novella by Guy De Maupassant 1888 
Afloat, an English name for Piao (album), Mandarin-language album by Zhao Wei
Afloat, album by The NJE 2017